Keith LaCharles Crawford (born November 21, 1970 in Palestine, Texas) is a former cornerback in the National Football League.

Career
Crawford spent his first season in the NFL with the New York Giants. After a year away from the NFL, he joined the Green Bay Packers for the 1995 NFL season. He then spent the next two seasons with the St. Louis Rams and a season with the Kansas City Chiefs. In his final season in the NFL, he returned to the Packers. He also played for the Memphis Maniax of the XFL.

He played at the collegiate level at Howard Payne University.

See also
List of New York Giants players
List of Green Bay Packers players

References

External links
Just Sports Stats

1970 births
Living people
People from Palestine, Texas
New York Giants players
Green Bay Packers players
St. Louis Rams players
Kansas City Chiefs players
American football wide receivers
American football defensive backs
Howard Payne Yellow Jackets football players
Memphis Maniax players